Allen J. Bloomfield (May 29, 1883 – September 21, 1932) was an American businessman and politician from New York.

Life
He was born in Warren, New York to Charles W. and Elizabeth (McCredy) Bloomfield. He graduated B.A. from Columbia College in 1904, and then engaged in the hotel business in Richfield Springs. On October 31, 1906, he married Renelcha (Elderkin) Tuller (died c. 1910), and they had two children. In 1915, he married Ruby Emma (Newcomb) Quick, and they had two daughters.

Bloomfield was a member of the New York State Assembly (Otsego Co.) in 1915, 1916, 1917, 1918, 1919 and 1920.

He was a member of the New York State Senate (39th D.) from 1921 to 1924, sitting in the 144th, 145th, 146th and 147th New York State Legislatures. Later he continued to hold a variety of civic offices, and at the time of his death was President of the Village of Richfield Springs.

He died on September 21, 1932, in Mary Imogene Bassett Hospital in Cooperstown, New York, after an operation for a ruptured appendix; and was buried at the Lakeview Cemetery in Richfield Springs.

Sources
 General register of the members of the Phi Kappa sigma fraternity, 1850-1930 (1930; pg. 264)
 The Hon. Allen J. Bloomfield in The Otsego Farmer on September 23, 1932 (with portrait)

External links
 

1883 births
1932 deaths
Republican Party New York (state) state senators
People from Herkimer County, New York
Republican Party members of the New York State Assembly
Columbia College (New York) alumni
Deaths from appendicitis
People from Cooperstown, New York
20th-century American politicians